Farhad Shetul is a Bangladeshi professional field hockey player and he is an international player in Bangladesh. He is a player of Bangladesh national field hockey team.

References 

Bangladeshi male field hockey players
Field hockey players at the 2018 Asian Games
Year of birth missing (living people)
Asian Games competitors for Bangladesh
South Asian Games bronze medalists for Bangladesh
South Asian Games medalists in field hockey
Living people